Sir Harold Smedley  (19 June 1920 – 16 February 2004) was a British diplomat who was envoy to several countries.

Career
Harold Smedley was educated at Aldenham School and Pembroke College, Cambridge. During World War II he served in the Royal Marines and was an officer in 48 Commando at the Normandy landings in 1944. In 1946 he entered the Dominions Office (which became the Commonwealth Relations Office in the following year). He served as private secretary to the Permanent Under-Secretary 1947–48; in the British High Commissioner's office in Wellington, New Zealand, 1948–50; at Salisbury, Southern Rhodesia, 1951–53; as principal private secretary to the Secretary of State for Commonwealth Relations 1954–57; and with the rank of Counsellor in the High Commissioner's offices at Calcutta in 1957 and New Delhi 1958–60.

Smedley was High Commissioner in Ghana 
1964–67 (with a break from December 1965 to March 1966 when the Ghanaian president, Kwame Nkrumah, broke off diplomatic relations over Rhodesia). He was Ambassador to Laos 1968–70; Assistant Under-Secretary at the Foreign and Commonwealth Office 1970–72; secretary-general to Lord Pearce's Commission on Rhodesian Opinion (of a proposed settlement) 1971–72; High Commissioner in Sri Lanka and non-resident Ambassador to the Maldives 1973–75; High Commissioner in New Zealand and concurrently Governor of the Pitcairn Islands 1976–80; and also non-resident High Commissioner in Western Samoa 1977–80.

After retiring from the Diplomatic Service, Smedley was chairman of the London board of Bank of New Zealand 1983–89 and a member of West Sussex County Council 1989–93. He was president of the Hakluyt Society 1987–92.

Smedley was appointed a Member of the Order of the British Empire in the New Year Honours of 1946 for his wartime service, Companion of the Order of St Michael and St George in the New Year Honours of 1965 and knighted as a Knight Commander of the Order of St Michael and St George in the New Year Honours of 1978. He was made a Serving Brother of the Order of St John in 1963.

Family
During his first posting to Wellington, New Zealand, Smedley met and married Beryl Harley Brown. As Beryl Smedley she wrote Partners in Diplomacy: The Changing Face of the Diplomat's Wife (Harley Press, 1990). She died in 2011.

References

External links
SMEDLEY, Sir Harold, Who Was Who, A & C Black, 1920–2007; online edn, Oxford University Press, Dec 2012
Obituary: Sir Harold Smedley, The Guardian, London, 25 February 2004
Sir Harold Smedley (obituary), The Times, London, 26 February 2004, page 39
Interview with Sir Harold Smedley & transcript, British Diplomatic Oral History Programme, Churchill College, Cambridge, 1997

|-

|-

1920 births
2004 deaths
People educated at Aldenham School
Members of West Sussex County Council
Alumni of Pembroke College, Cambridge
Royal Marines personnel of World War II
High Commissioners of the United Kingdom to Ghana
Ambassadors of the United Kingdom to Laos
High Commissioners of the United Kingdom to Sri Lanka
High Commissioners of the United Kingdom to the Maldives
High Commissioners of the United Kingdom to New Zealand
Governors of Pitcairn
High Commissioners of the United Kingdom to Samoa
Knights Commander of the Order of St Michael and St George
Members of the Order of the British Empire
Serving Brothers of the Order of St John
Royal Marines Commando officers
British expatriates in India
British expatriates in Southern Rhodesia
Civil servants in the Commonwealth Relations Office